Abbasabad (also Romanized as ‘Abbāsābād) is a village in Runiz Rural District, Runiz District, Estahban County, Fars Province, Iran. At the 2006 census, its population was 81, in 18 families.

References 

Populated places in Estahban County